is a city located in  Shimane Prefecture, Japan. The city belonged to Ohara District, which dissolved in 2004 after Unnan was established.

The modern city of Unnan was established on November 1, 2004, from the merger of the towns of Daitō, Kamo, and Kisuki (all from Ōhara District), the towns of Mitoya and Kakeya, and the village of Yoshida (all from Iishi District).

The city of Unnan has 6 wards which used to be the town's of Daitō, Kamo, Kisuki, Mitoya and Kakeya, and the village of Yoshida

As of March 1, 2017, the city had an estimated population of 38,281, and population density of 69 persons per km2.

Tourist attractions in or near Unnan include Lake Shinji, Ushio Hot Springs, Matsue Shinji Furusato Forest Park, Ohara Dam, Okuizumoyumura Hot Springs, Okuizumotane Natural Museum, Hikawabijin Hot Spring, Akagawahotaru Park, Suga Shrine, Shimaneken Akashimidorigaoka Park, Kisuki Health Forest, Sajiroonsen Choja Hot Spring, Ancient Iron Kayokan, Historical Museum of Iron.

Neighbouring cities includes Izumo, Matsue (capital) and Oda, The closest airport to Unnan is Izumo Airport which serves the city of Izumo and the capital city of Matsue.

Geography

Climate
Unnan has a humid subtropical climate (Köppen climate classification Cfa) with very warm summers and cool winters. Precipitation is abundant throughout the year.

Demographics
Per Japanese census data, the population of Unnan in 2020 is 36,007 people.

Kamo Iwakura Ruin

According to Unnan City Education Board official document report, a large number of relics suddenly found, during the construction and surveying inspection in October 1996, as resulting to 39 piece of Japanese bronze bell and dōtaku plant on Yayoi period (1st century BC), research by then Kamo Town Education Board official on 1997.

International relations

Twin towns — Sister cities
Unnan is twinned with:
 Richmond, Indiana, United States

References

External links
 Unnan City official website 

Cities in Shimane Prefecture